Sebastián Enrique Salazar Beltrán (born 30 September 1995) is a  Colombian professional footballer who plays as a defensive midfielder.

Club career

Independiente Santa Fe 
Coming from the reserves, Salazar made his debut with the club in 2014, under the command of Argentine coach Gustavo Costas. In the same year he was called to Colombia's U20 squad. He was considered one of the future key players of the club. But now he is a retired player.

Career statistics

Club

1 Includes Recopa Sudamericana and Suruga Bank Championship.

Honours

Club 
Santa Fe
Copa Sudamericana    : 2015
Categoría Primera A  : 2014-II
Superliga Colombiana : 2015, 2017

References

External links 

1995 births
Living people
Colombian footballers
Colombian expatriate footballers
Categoría Primera A players
Campeonato Brasileiro Série A players
Independiente Santa Fe footballers
Goiás Esporte Clube players
Association football midfielders
Footballers from Bogotá
Colombian expatriate sportspeople in Brazil
Expatriate footballers in Brazil